Lin Yuxin (born 12 October 2000) is a Chinese amateur golfer.

Aged 17, he qualified directly for both the 2018 Masters and the 2018 Open Championship as the 2017 Asia-Pacific Amateur champion. Playing in the first two rounds of the 2018 Masters at Augusta, Lin scored 79 and 80 for 15-over-par, which meant he missed the cut and did not qualify for the last two rounds. In the 2018 Open Championship at Carnoustie, he scored 80 and 74 for 12-over-par in the first two rounds, again missing the cut.

Lin was the first winner of the Asia-Pacific to receive a direct invitation to both the Masters and The Open Championship. Previously the winner had received an invitation to the Masters but it was only starting in 2018 that the winner also had an automatic Open entry.

In 2019, Lin won the Asia-Pacific Amateur Championship for a second time.

Amateur wins
2015 China Amateur Futures Tour Final
2017 Asia-Pacific Amateur Championship
2019 Asia-Pacific Amateur Championship

Source:

Results in major championships
Results not in chronological order before 2019 and in 2020.

CUT = missed the half way cut
NT = No tournament due to COVID-19 pandemic

Team appearances
Arnold Palmer Cup (representing the International team): 2020 (winners), 2021

References

External links
 
 
 

Chinese male golfers
Amateur golfers
USC Trojans men's golfers
Left-handed golfers
2000 births
Living people
21st-century Chinese people